Albert Fuller may refer to:
 Albert Fuller (musician), American harpsichordist, conductor and proponent of early music
 Albert Fuller (politician), British member of parliament
 Albert W. Fuller, American architect